Leptomyxa reticulata is a species of Amoebozoa.

A relationship to Rhizamoeba has been suggested.

See also
 Leptomyxida

References

Tubulinea